Mycenaean may refer to:  
 Something from or belonging to the ancient town of Mycenae in the Peloponnese in Greece
 Mycenaean Greece, the Greek-speaking regions of the Aegean Sea as of the Late Bronze Age
 Mycenaean language, an ancient form of Greek
 Helladic period, the material-cultural period in the eastern Mediterranean in the Bronze Age associated with the Mycenaean Greeks

Language and nationality disambiguation pages